Raimund Riedewald (born 4 November 1986) is a Dutch former footballer. He played at centre back.

Riedewald's career began when he signed a professional contract with ADO Den Haag, making his first first-team appearance in 2006, at the age of 19. He played for lower-tier clubs Haaglandia and FC Rijnvogels from 2008 to 2010, before retiring from football.

References

External links
 Voetbal International profile

1986 births
Living people
Dutch footballers
Association football defenders
ADO Den Haag players
Eredivisie players
Eerste Divisie players
Footballers from The Hague
Haaglandia players
FC Rijnvogels players